Åsum is a village and eastern suburb of Odense, Funen, Denmark.  It contains a church.

References

Suburbs of Odense
Populated places in Funen
Odense Municipality